Muhlbach-sur-Munster is a commune in the Haut-Rhin department in Grand Est in north-eastern France. It is the birthplace of the German publisher Johann Carolus, founder of the earliest known newspaper in 1605.

People 
 Johann Carolus (1575-1634), German printer

Sister city
  Kermaria-Sulard, France

See also
 Communes of the Haut-Rhin département

References

Communes of Haut-Rhin